Opabiniidae is an extinct family of marine stem-arthropods. Its type and best-known genus is Opabinia. It also contains Utaurora. Opabiniids closely resemble radiodonts, but their frontal appendages were basally fused into a proboscis. Opabiniids also distinguishable from radiodonts by setal blades covering at least part of the body flaps and serrated caudal rami.

History of study
Opabiniidae was named by Charles Doolittle Walcott in 1912, alongside its type species Opabinia. Walcott interpreted Opabiniidae as a family of anostracan crustaceans, most closely related to Thamnocephalidae. Opabinia was restudied in the 1970s, and reinterpreted as a stranger animal. Stephen Jay Gould referred to Opabinia as a "weird wonder", and an illustration of Opabinia prompted laughter when it was first revealed at a paleontological conference. In 2022, a second opabiniid, Utaurora, was identified.

Myoscolex from Emu Bay Shale is sometimes suggested to be an opabiniid, but morphological features supporting this interpretation are controversial. Mieridduryn is a panarthropod from the Middle Ordovician that shares features with both radiodonts and opabiniids.

References

Works cited

 
 
 

Prehistoric arthropod families
Dinocarida